Yeh Kaali kaali Ankhein is an Indian Hindi-language romantic crime thriller streaming television series on Netflix created and directed by Sidharth Sengupta. The series stars Tahir Raj Bhasin, Shweta Tripathi and Anchal Singh in the lead roles with Saurabh Shukla, Surya Sharma, Arunoday Singh and Brijendra Kala playing supporting roles. The title of the series is derived from a song from Baazigar.

Release
"Yeh Kaali Kaali Ankhein" was released on Netflix on 14 January 2022.

Cast
 Tahir Raj Bhasin as Vikrant Singh Chauhan
 Shweta Tripathi as Shikha 
 Anchal Singh as Purva Awasthi 
 Surya Sharma as Dharmesh
 Saurabh Shukla as Akheraj Awasthi "Vidrohi", Purva's Father
 Brijendra Kala as Vikrant's father 
 Arunoday Singh as killer 
 Anant Joshi as Golden, Vikrant's best friend
 Hetal Gada as Vikrant's sister
 Sunita Rajwar as Vikrant's mother
 Vikrant Koundal in special appearance
Aasif Sheikh in special appearance

References

External links

 

Hindi-language Netflix original programming
2022 Indian television series debuts
Romantic crime films